Ante Dabro (born 13 January 1938, Čavoglave, Croatia) is a Croatian-born Australian artist/sculptor and art teacher who has lived and worked in Canberra, Australian Capital Territory since the late 1960s.

Dabro's sculptures are typified by angular form; many are nudes and bronzes. His work is said to embody universal themes, "suffering, hope, sexuality, heroism, spirituality" but also silently acknowledge the 'outsider'.

Principal works

A selection of Dabro's works are listed:

 Royal Australian Navy Memorial, Canberra - Sailors and Ships - Interaction and Interdependence (1986), unveiled by Queen Elizabeth II on 1986-03-03, the 75th anniversary of the Navy.
 Australian National University:
 Contemplation (2002) - a response to the poetry of Judith Wright
 Sir Winston Churchill (2001) - Winston Churchill Trust
 Brindabella Business Park, Canberra Airport; these are in the collection of the airport's owner, Terry Snow, and are on loan to BBP:
 four bronzes at water features, Susanne, Dancer, and The Bathers, all dated 2005
 a bronze figure Genesis (2009), unveiled 2009-06-02 by the Governor General of Australia, Quentin Bryce.
 Canberra City
 "Resilience" (2009)
 Saint Matthew, (1984), St Matthew's Roman Catholic Church, Page, ACT

Career
 1964 - graduate, Academy of Fine Arts, Zagreb
 1966 - Master of Arts, Academy of Fine Arts, Zagreb
 1967 - emigrated to Australia, settled in Canberra
 1971-2004 - teacher, School of Art, Australian National University
 1984-6 - commission, Royal Australian Navy Memorial, Anzac Parade, Canberra
 1989
 commission, Liberal Party of Australia, miniature bust of Sir Robert Menzies
 commission, Government of Australia, for French Bicentenary, sculpture of naval explorer Jean-François de Galaup, comte de La Pérouse (now in Paris)
 1999 - Retrospective solo exhibition, 1969–99, Drill Hall Gallery, Canberra
 2005 - commissions, for Terry Snow and Canberra Airport

Staircase thefts
On the Staircase is a group of four stylised male figures, progressively smaller as they are further up a staircase of diminishing size, all in bronze. The figures are each reading a book. It cost $80,000. After it was again vandalised, in the local media it was attributed to Ante Dabro. Yet, it had been attributed correctly weeks earlier by another outlet to Danish artist, Keld Moseholm Dabro was quoted in local media, as being upset to the vandalism of art, perhaps adding to the confusion among the media. The smallest figure was removed on 8 December 2013, with the act visible on footage from a CCTV camera, with two women shown shortly before the theft. After the publicity, on the following day the figure was handed into a local ACT Police station.

References

External links

 Dabro's web site
 Recent works

1938 births
Living people
People from Ružić, Croatia
Croatian sculptors
20th-century Australian sculptors
21st-century Australian sculptors